Andrzej Chyra (born 27 August 1964) is a Polish actor and a member of the Polish Film Academy and the European Film Academy.

Life and career
He graduated from high school and in 1987 he graduated from the Acting Theater School in Warsaw. In 1994, he majored at the same university in directing.

He made his film debut in 1993, with the role of Benvollo in the film Order of Affection, directed by Radosław Piwowarski. The largest role so far that brought him recognition was as Gerard Nowak in the 1999 film The Debt (Dług) by Krzysztof Krauze, for which he was awarded the Best Actor award at the Polish Film Festival in Gdynia.  The success of this was repeated in 2005 when he received the PFF Gdynia prize for his role in Komornik. He was also nominated in 2006 for his role in the film, We're All Christs.

Filmography

Film

 1988 – Decalogue IV (TV Mini-Series) - Theatre Student (uncredited)
 1993 – Kolejność uczuć - Actor playing Benvoll
 1994 – Zawrócony (TV Movie) - Priest
 1999 – Dług - Gerard Nowak
 1999 – Kallafiorr
 2000 – Gra
 2000 – Wyrok na Franciszka Kłosa
 2001 – Pieniądze to nie wszystko
 2001 – Przedwiośnie
 2001 – Where Eskimos Live
 2001 – Wiedźmin
 2003 – Pogoda na jutro
 2003 – Powiedz to, Gabi
 2003 – Siedem przystanków na drodze do raju
 2003 – Symetria
 2003 – Zmruż oczy
 2004 – Ono
 2004 – Tulipany
 2005 – Komornik
 2005 – Persona Non Grata
 2006 – Palimpsest
 2006 – S@motność w sieci
 2006 – Strike
 2006 – We're All Christs
 2007 – Katyń
 2008 – Magiczne drzewo
 2008 – Nieruchomy poruszyciel
 2009 – Wszystko co kocham
 2009 – Zdjęcie
 2010 – Mistyfikacja
 2012 - Land of Oblivion
 2013 - In the Name Of
 2013 - Lasting
 2016 - United States of Love
 2017 - Frost
 2017 - Beyond Words
 2019 - Listen to the Universe
 2020 - Doctor Lisa
 2020 - Never Gonna Snow Again
 2020 - Kill It and Leave This Town (voice only)
 2021 - All Our Fears
 2021 - The Wedding

Television
 1996 – Bar "Atlantic"
 1996 – Honor dla niezaawansowanych
 1997 – Boża podszewka
 1997 – Zaklęta
 1998 – Miodowe lata
 2000–2001 – Miasteczko
 2000 – Twarze i maski
 2002 – Przedwiośnie
 2002 – Wiedźmin
 2003–2005 – Defekt
 2003 – Zaginiona
 2004–2005 – Oficer
 2006 – Oficerowie
 2006 – S@motność w sieci
 2007 – Cztery poziomo
 2022 – Cracow Monsters
 2023 – A Girl and an Astronaut

References

External links

 
 Andrzej Chyra at the Film Polski
Andrzej Chyra at culture.pl

1964 births
Living people
People from Lwówek Śląski County
Polish male film actors
Polish male stage actors
Aleksander Zelwerowicz National Academy of Dramatic Art in Warsaw alumni
Polish atheists